Parks in the city of Markham, Ontario are maintained by the Parks and Forestry Department under the Community & Fire Services Commission.

Usage

Most of the city parks are free, Milne Dam Conservation Area requires a fee during weekends. Most parks are closed from 12 midnight to 5am to discourage loitering. Garbage and recycling containers are available at most parks, while portable toilets are found in parks with ball or sports facilities. They are maintained by the city staff, but there is expectations users maybe asked to keep the park clean. Signage in old parks are wood and are being in process of being replaced with newer metal signs.

History
Markham's park system emerged mostly in the latter part of the 20th century (earliest parks emerged during the 1960s and 1970s in Thornhill but Morgan Park in Markham Village evolved from 1924 to 1957) as it emerged into a suburban community. Parks are adding during the development of newer residential areas.

List of parks

Most parks are named for their respective neighbourhoods, while some are named for notable individuals or family names linked to Markham's past.

 Aldergrove Park
 Alfred Patterson Pond
 Amber Glen Park
 Annswell Park
 Appleview Parkette
 Armadale Park
 Armstrong Park
 Arthur Lismer Park
 Ashton Meadows Park
 Austin Drive Park
 Bayview Glen Park
 Bayview Reservoir Park
 Beaupre Park
 Benjamin Thorne Park - mill owner and namesake of Thornhill, Ontario
 Billingsley Woodlot
 Bishop's Cross Park
 Black Walnut Park
 Brando Park
 Bur Oak Park
 Calvert Park
 Cakebread Park
 Carlton Park
Carolyn Clements Park - named for Carolyn Clements, a resident known for preserving heritage homes
 Castlemore Park
 Cathedral (King David) Park
 Cedar Valley
 Cedar Wood Splash Park
 Centennial Park
 Charlie Clifford Park
 Charing Cross Parkette
 Charity Crescent Park
 Circlewood Park
 Clark Young Woods
 Cobblehill Parkette
 Coledale Park
 Coppard Park
 Cornell Parkette
 Cornell Rouge Woods Park
 Crosby Memorial Park
 Dalton Parkette
 Denison Park
 Don Valley Park
 Elson Park - named for former councillor Miles Elson
 Featherstone Park
 Ferrah Park
 Fieldside Parkette
 Fincham Park
 Forsters Commons
 Franklin Carmichael Park
 Frederick Bagg Park
 German Mills Settlers Park
 Gordon Weeden Park
 Grand Cornell Park
 Grandview Park
 Greensborough Town Centre
 Harvest Gate Park
 Harvest Moon Park
 Harold Humprhreys Park
 Highgate Park
 Hillmount Park
 Honsberger Field (John Honsberger Field) - local area lawyer
 Hughson Park
 Huntington Park
 Leighland Park
 Lloyd Robertson Park - named for Lloyd Robertson, local area resident and former CTV journalist
 James Edward Park
 John Button Waterway - founder of Buttonville, Ontario
 John Daniels Park
 Johnsview Park
 Macrill Crescent Pond
 Maple Valley Park
 Markham Civic Centre
 McCowan Freeman Parkette - local RCAF Pilot WO Alexander McCowan Freeman, died during World War II
 Middlefield Corners
 Milliken Mills Park
 Milne Dam Conservation Park
 Milton Fierheller Park
 Mintleaf Park
 Monarch Park
 Morgan Park - opened as Rose Garden (Test Plot) in 1924 and closed in 1957 for Lions Club Pool
 Morning Dove Square
 Mossy Stone Park
 Mount Joy Park
 Orchard View Park
 Paddock Park
 Paramount Park
 Personna Park
 Pioneer Park
 Pomona Mills Park
 Proctor Park
 Quantztown Park
 Randall Park
 Raybeck Park
 Raymerville Woodlot
 Reesor Park - named for the Reesor family
 Riseborough Park
 Riverwalk Park
 Rough Valley Park
 Roxbury Park
 Roy Rainey Park
 Royal Orchard Park
 Shania Johnston Parkette - local girl who died from cancer
 Sherwood Estates Park
 Simonston Park
 Sir Robert Watson Watt Park
 Springdale Park
 Stalmaster Park
 Stargell Park
 Starhill Parkette
 Summerdale Park
 Swan Lake Park
 Tomlinson Park
 Toogood Park
 Upper Cornell Park
 Valley View Park
 Victoria Square Park
 Village Park
 Wilclay Park
 Willowheights Park
 Wismer Park
 Woodland Park

Others

Rouge Park was a regional park that has sections within Markham managed by York Region and TRCA from 1995 to 2015. Bob Hunter Memorial Park is located in Markham and is part of the Rouge system. The park along with sections in Toronto, as well as some parts of the Pickering Airport from Transport Canada were transferred to Parks Canada to form the Rouge National Urban Park in 2015.

Gallery

References

External links

Parklands

Markham, Ontario
Tourist attractions in Markham, Ontario
Parks in the Regional Municipality of York
Markham